Let There Be Eve...Ruff Ryders' First Lady is the debut studio album by American rapper Eve. It was released by Ruff Ryders Entertainment and Interscope Records on September 14, 1999. All of the songs on the album were written by Eve herself. It sold over 200,000 copies in the first week. The album has sold over 2 million copies and was certified Double Platinum by the Recording Industry Association of America. The album features singles such as "Gotta Man", and "Love Is Blind" with Faith Evans. Eve became the third female hip-hop artist to have her album peak at number-one on the Billboard 200 (Lauryn Hill's debut album, The Miseducation of Lauryn Hill, being the first to top the chart in 1998 and Foxy Brown's second album, Chyna Doll achieving the feat earlier in 1999).

Critical reception

AllMusic editor Theresa E. LaVeck found that "Eve's conviction and passion make her noticeable no matter what the subject, but she truly stands out when the stories become personal, examining the cost of the hard life she champions in other songs. "Love Is Blind" is a painful look at domestic violence. Self-respect and positivity are the moral of "Heaven Only Knows." Both tracks are backed by beautiful arrangements with acoustic guitar and lush vocals. Eve maintains her hardcore image in these tracks, but with a subtle vulnerability that promise lots of interesting things to come from this Philly prodigy."

Track listing

Personnel
Credits for Let There Be Eve...Ruff Ryders' First Lady adapted from AllMusic.

 Adam "Bunnie" Grossman – engineer
 Adam Gazzola – instrumentation
 Charles Duffy – art direction, design
 Chris Theis – engineer
 Dee Dean – executive producer
 DMX – performer
 Eric – performer
 Eric Smith – engineer
 Eve – vocals
 The Icepick – producer
 Jonathan Mannion – photography
 Kithe Brewster – stylist
 Mario DeArce – editing
 P.K – producer
 Rich Keller – multi Instruments, mixing, instrumentation
 Ron Martinez – vocals
 Shok – producer
 Swizz Beatz – producer, associate producer
 Taryn Simon – photography
 Tony Dawsey – mastering
 Tony Maserati – mixing
 Waah – executive producer, art direction, design

Charts

Weekly charts

Year-end charts

Certifications

See also
 List of number-one albums of 1999 (U.S.)
 List of number-one R&B albums of 1999 (U.S.)

References

1999 debut albums
Eve (rapper) albums
Albums produced by Swizz Beatz
Ruff Ryders Entertainment albums
Interscope Records albums
Interscope Geffen A&M Records albums